Colegio Oxford Bachillerato is a senior high school on the property of Universidad Anáhuac del Sur, in colonia Torres de Potrero, Álvaro Obregón, Mexico City.

References

External links
 Colegio Oxford Bachillerato 

High schools in Mexico City